A list of books and essays by or about Jean Renoir:

Renoir, Jean